Galva Township is one of twenty-four townships in Henry County, Illinois, USA.  As of the 2010 census, its population was 2,837 and it contained 1,402 housing units.

History
Galva Township was named by Olaf Johnson, a native of Gävle, in Sweden.

Geography

Cities, towns, villages
 Galva

Adjacent townships
 Burns Township (north)
 Wethersfield Township (east)
 Goshen Township, Stark County (southeast)
 Lynn Township, Knox County (south)
 Walnut Grove Township, Knox County (southwest)
 Weller Township (west)
 Cambridge Township (northwest)

Cemeteries
The township contains Saint Johns Cemetery.

Major highways
  U.S. Route 34
  Illinois Route 17

Landmarks
 Wiley Park

Demographics

School districts
 Galva Community Unit School District 224
 Wethersfield Community Unit School District 230

Political districts
 Illinois's 17th congressional district
 State House District 74
 State Senate District 37

References
 
 United States Census Bureau 2008 TIGER/Line Shapefiles
 United States National Atlas

External links
 City-Data.com
 Illinois State Archives
 Township Officials of Illinois

Townships in Henry County, Illinois
Townships in Illinois